Robert Finch (24 August 1948 – 18 September 1978) was an English professional footballer who played as a full back.

Career
Finch turned professional with Queens Park Rangers in 1966 before making his senior debut two years later. In total, Finch made six appearances for Queens Park Rangers in the Football League  between 1968 and 1969. Finch later played in South Africa for Cape Town City, before dying of meningitis on 18 September 1978, at the age of 30.

References

1948 births
1978 deaths
Footballers from Camberwell
English footballers
Association football fullbacks
Queens Park Rangers F.C. players
Cape Town City F.C. (NFL) players
English Football League players
Neurological disease deaths in England
Infectious disease deaths in England
Deaths from meningitis
National Football League (South Africa) players